Enrico Volterra (11 June 1905, Rome – 29 June 1973) was an Italian engineer.

Biography
A son of the famous mathematician Vito Volterra, Enrico Volterra received in 1928 his degree in civil engineering from the Sapienza University of Rome and, in the same year, his professional qualification (abilitazione) in bridges and roads from the Polytechnic School of Engineering in Naples. He became in Rome an academic assistant to the Chair of Marine Construction and then in Paris a researcher in photoelastic methods at the École Nationale des Ponts et Chausées, before returning in Rome to start work as a civil engineer.

In 1932 he was an Invited Speaker at the ICM in Zürich.

In 1948 he joined the faculty of the Illinois Institute of Technology in Chicago, then the Rensselaer Polytechnic Institute in Troy, New York, and in 1957 the University of Texas at Austin.

He married and was the father of two daughters.

Selected publications

Articles

with T.-C. Chang:

Books
with E. C. Zachmanoglou: 
with J. H. Gaines:

References

1905 births
1973 deaths
20th-century Italian Jews
Sapienza University of Rome alumni
Alumni of the University of Cambridge
Engineers from Rome
University of Texas faculty
20th-century Italian engineers